Humoresque is a genre of Romantic music.

Humoresque may also refer to:
 Humoresque (1920 film)
 Humoresque (1946 film)
 "Humoresque" (Jack White song), from his 2018 album Boarding House Reach

See also 
 Humoresques (Dvořák), a piano cycle by Antonín Dvořák